Brodzki (feminine: Brodzka, plural: Brodzcy) is a Polish surname. Notable people with the surname include:

Ewa Brodzka (born 1959), Polish film-maker
Guillaume Brodzki (born 1977), Contemporary French Poet
Marek Brodzki (born 1960), Polish film director and television director
Nicholas Brodzsky (1905–1958) Russian-born film music composer

See also
Bródzki
Brodsky

Polish-language surnames